George McKelvey may refer to:

 George McKelvey (mayor), American politician, mayor of Youngstown, Ohio
 George McKelvey (soccer), Scottish-American soccer player
 George McKelvey (lawman), constable of Charleston, Arizona Territory in 1881